SS Excelsior may refer to:

 SS Excelsior (football club), a club from Réunion Island established in 1940
 , one of several steam-powered ships named Excelsior